Kevin Clancy (born 23 November 1973) is a Scottish football referee who has been on the international list of FIFA referees since January 2012 after attending a course at UEFA's Centre of Refereeing Excellence. Clancy has been refereeing since 2000.

References

1983 births
Scottish football referees
Living people
Gabelli School of Business alumni
Scottish Football League referees
Scottish Premier League referees
Scottish Professional Football League referees